Francisco Rovira Beleta (Barcelona, 1913 – 23 June 1999) was a twice Academy Award nominee Spanish screenwriter and film director. His film Los atracadores was entered into the 12th Berlin International Film Festival. His 1963 film Los Tarantos was nominated for an Academy Award in the Best Foreign Film category. Four years later, his film El amor brujo was also nominated for the Best Foreign Language Oscar and was entered into the 5th Moscow International Film Festival.

Selected filmography
Luna de sangre (1952)
Hay un camino a la derecha (1953)
 Eleven Pairs of Boots (1954)
 Andalusia Express (1956)
Familia provisional (1958)
 The Big Show (1960)
Los Atracadores (1962)
Los Tarantos (1963)
La dama del alba (1966)
El amor brujo (1967)

References

External links

1913 births
1999 deaths
People from Barcelona
Spanish male writers
Male screenwriters
Spanish film directors
20th-century Spanish screenwriters
20th-century Spanish male writers